Limnorimarga is a genus of crane flies in the family Limoniidae.

Distribution
Russian Far East, North Korea & Japan.

Species
L. limonioides (Alexander, 1921)

References

Limoniidae
Tipulomorpha genera
Diptera of Asia